Armando Navarrete Navarrete (February 28, 1934 – May 14, 2014), better known as Mandolino, was a Chilean actor, singer and comedian. Navarrete was known in the United States, Chile and in the rest of Latin America for his collaboration alongside Don Francisco in the Saturday evenings variety show, Sabado Gigante (Sabados Gigantes in Chile). Navarrete began his show business career as a singer for a Chilean musical group named Los Flamingos, with whom Navarrte established himself in Argentina.

Early life
Navarrete was born in Concepcion, Chile.

Entertainment career
Navarrete first started out as a singer, joining Los Flamingos when the group was formed in 1955. Los Flamingos were one of the first rock music bands in Chile; they moved to Argentina in 1959 to expand their fame, and returned to Chile in 1962 to host a television show named De Fiesta Con Los Flamingos, (Partying With Los Flamingos) co-hosted also by Enrique Maluenda.

Around 1969 or 1970, Navarrete met Mario Kreutzberger, better known as Don Francisco, who had already established Sabados Gigantes in Chile, and he spoke to Kreutzberger about creating a character for the show who would be the antithesis to Kreutzberger's on-camera persona of Don Francisco- Mandolino, a wise-cracking, always doubting-of-others character who would counterattack Don Franciscos assertions to 'lower' Don Franciscos (the character) self-esteem and make Don Francisco seem more down to earth to Chilean audiences. At first, Kreutzberger was reluctant to include Mandolino in the show regularly, but he relented and then, Navarrete began his long association with the television presenter, which extended into well after Sabado Gigante had been established on Univision in the United States.

In forming the character of Mandolino, Navarrete was inspired by the American comedy duo of Dean Martin and Jerry Lewis. He was helped design Mandolino by Mexican comedian Cantinflas, who suggested to him that Mandolino wear loose pants on his sketches.

With Mandolino, Navarrete earned popularity in Chile and in the rest of Latin America. When, on April 12, 1986, Sabado Gigante began to be shown in the United States live from Miami on Univision, Navarrete began working in the Florida city. Navarrete worked at Sabado Gigante for five more years but, during 1991, a fight took place between him and countryman Kreutzberger. As a consequence, Navarrete was fired. For a period afterwards, he sold newspapers in the United States to sustain himself. Navarrete also found work for a brief time with Univision's main rival Telemundo.

Later life
In 2011, Navarrete moved to Honduras along with his daughter Lidia. Navarrete began hosting a show there on Television Educativa Nacional's canal 10 of Honduras, named La Hora de Mandolino. This show also helped his daughter Lidia to become a celebrity in the Central American nation.

Death
On May 14, 2014, Navarro died in Tegucigalpa of a heart attack while on his sleep.

See also

List of Chileans

References 

1934 births
2014 deaths
Chilean male singers
Chilean actors
Chilean emigrants to Honduras
Chilean emigrants to the United States